Scottish local elections were held in 1967 to elect members to the various Corporations, Burghs, and County Boards of Scotland.

SNP Gains
The election was contested by a large number of SNP candidates, following on from the parties success good showing in the 1967 Glasgow Pollok by-election. The SNP ultimately won 16% of the vote in the municipal elections, and won 23 seats. The election also saw the SNP gain their first Councillor on Clydebank Burgh Council.

Conservative entry into Local Government
The elections also saw the first time that Conservatives contested local elections on a Conservative ticket. Previously the Conservative party had not contested local elections, with their place being instead fulfilled by local anti-socialist groups known as the Progressives. Despite these organisational differences however, the Progressives were seen be the electorate as Tories, and the two shared the same ideology.

The Conservative party's decision to partake in local elections was largely driven out of a desire to increase party efficiency. In contrast to the Conservatives, Labour had been competing in Scottish local elections for many years. This was seen as providing Labour party activists a great deal of valuable campaigning experience, whilst the Conservative party electoral machine had only been deployed in the intermittent general elections and by-elections. The lack of involvement in local elections also meant that the Conservatives were unable to assess party support as well as Labour. Even in 1974, when the Conservatives had been fighting local elections for several years, the party was still taken by surprise by the surge in SNP support in what were seen as traditional Scottish Tory heartlands.

Results

Municipal Results

Municipal Aggregate

Municipal Breakdown

Source:

County Results

County Breakdown

References